No. 193 Squadron RAF was a fighter squadron of the Royal Air Force during World War II.

History
No. 193 Squadron was formed at RAF Harrowbeer, Devon on 18 December 1942 as a fighter/ground attack unit. Although designated to operate the new Hawker Typhoon, the squadron at first used the Hawker Hurricane until the Typhoon was declared operational in April 1943.

In November 1943 the squadron was used to attack the German V-1 launch sites. The squadron then moved base in the south of England a number of times supporting the buildup for invasion. From 6 June 1944 the squadron was busy supporting the invasion force in the close-support fighter-bomber role. It was based on the Continent from 11 September 1944 as it continued to support the advancing armies in France, Belgium and Germany. The squadron disbanded on 31 August 1945 at Hildesheim.

Trivia
Some of the squadron's Typhoon aircraft were paid for by the Brazilian branch of the Fellowship of the Bellows, which were a loosely organised international groups formed during World War II to collect funds for the purchase of aircraft for the Royal Air Force.

Aircraft operated

See also
 Cap Arcona
 List of Royal Air Force aircraft squadrons

References

Notes

Bibliography

 Bowyer, Michael J.F. and John D.R. Rawlings. Squadron Codes, 1937–56. Cambridge, UK: Patrick Stephens Ltd., 1979. .
 Flintham, Vic and Andrew Thomas. Combat Codes: A full explanation and listing of British, Commonwealth and Allied air force unit codes since 1938. Shrewsbury, Shropshire, UK: Airlife Publishing Ltd., 2003. .
 Halley, James J. The Squadrons of the Royal Air Force & Commonwealth 1918–1988. Tonbridge, Kent, UK: Air Britain (Historians) Ltd., 1988. .
 Jefford, C.G. RAF Squadrons, a Comprehensive record of the Movement and Equipment of all RAF Squadrons and their Antecedents since 1912. Shrewsbury, Shropshire, UK: Airlife Publishing, 1988 (second edition 2001). .
 Rawlings, John D.R. Fighter Squadrons of the RAF and their Aircraft. London: Macdonald & Jane's (Publishers) Ltd., 1969 (2nd edition 1976, reprinted 1978). .

External links

 Journals from a World War II pilot in 193 Squadron; 193 photos
 Squadron page at MOD site

193 Squadron
Military units and formations established in 1917
Fighter squadrons of the Royal Air Force in World War II
Military units and formations disestablished in 1945
1917 establishments in the United Kingdom